Jonathan Brown (1893 – 6 November 1918) was an English professional football left half who made one appearance in the Football League for Burnley in 1914.

Military service 
Brown served as a private in the East Lancashire Regiment during the First World War and was killed in France on 6 November 1918, just five days before the Armistice. He was buried in Maubeuge-Centre Cemetery.

Honours 
Burnley
 East Lancashire Charity Cup: 1914–15

Career statistics

References 

1893 births
1918 deaths
English footballers
English Football League players
Association football wing halves
Association football defenders
Great Harwood F.C. players
Burnley F.C. players
People from Clayton-le-Moors
British Army personnel of World War I
British military personnel killed in World War I
East Lancashire Regiment soldiers